Arundhathi Subramaniam is an Indian poet and author, who has written about culture and spirituality.

Life and career 
Subramaniam is a poet and writer based in Mumbai. She is the author of thirteen books of poetry and prose.

She has received the Raza Award for Poetry, the Zee Women's Award for Literature, the International Piero Bigongiari Prize in Italy, the Charles Wallace, Visiting Arts and Homi Bhabha Fellowships.

Her volume of poetry, When God is a Traveller was the Season Choice of the Poetry Book Society,, was shortlisted for the T.S. Eliot Prize in 2015 and won the Sahitya Akademi Award for the year 2020.

Her poetry has been published in Reasons for Belonging: Fourteen Contemporary Poets (Penguin India); Sixty Indian Poets (Penguin India), Both Sides of the Sky (National Book Trust, India),We Speak in Changing Languages (Sahitya Akademi), Fulcrum No 4: An Annual of Poetry and Aesthetics (Fulcrum Poetry Press, US), The Bloodaxe Book of Contemporary Indian Poets (Bloodaxe, UK), Anthology of Contemporary Indian Poetry( United States ), The Dance of the Peacock: An Anthology of English Poetry from India, featuring 151 Indian English poets, edited by Vivekanand Jha and published by Hidden Brook Press, Canada. and Atlas: New Writing (Crossword/ Aark Arts)

She has worked as Head of Dance and Chauraha (an inter-arts forum) at the National Centre for the Performing Arts in Mumbai, and has been Editor of the India domain of the Poetry International Web.

Awards
On 25 January 2015, Arundhathi won the first Khushwant Singh Memorial Prize for Poetry for her work 'When God is a Traveller'.

On 22 December 2017, Arundhathi won the first Mystic Kalinga Literary Award announced during the Kalinga Literary Festival.

She won Sahitya Akademi Award 2020 for English for When God is a Traveller.

Bibliography

Poetry 
Love Without a Story 
When God Is a Traveller.,
Where I Live: New & Selected Poems. Bloodaxe Books UK, 2009. 
Where I Live. (Poetry in English). Allied Publishers India, 2005. 
On Cleaning Bookshelves. (Poetry in English). Allied Publishers India, 2001.

Prose 
Women Who Wear Only Themselves, Speaking Tiger, 2021
Adiyogi: The Source of Yoga (co-author with Sadhguru)  Harper Element, 2017, 
Sadhguru: More Than A Life, biography, Penguin Ananda, 2010 (third reprint)
The Book of Buddha, Penguin, 2005 (reprinted several times)

As editor 
Pilgrim’s India (An Anthology of Essays and Poems on Sacred Journeys), Penguin, 2011
Confronting Love (An Anthology of Contemporary Indian Love Poems) (Co-edited with Jerry Pinto), Penguin, 2005
 Eating God: A Book of Bhakti Poetry, Penguin, 2014

See also

 Indian English Literature
 Indian Writing in English

References

External links 
 Official website

Indian women poets
English-language poets from India
Living people
Indian women essayists
21st-century Indian women writers
21st-century Indian writers
Indian women editors
Indian editors
Indian magazine editors
21st-century Indian poets
21st-century Indian essayists
Women magazine editors
Recipients of the Sahitya Akademi Award in English
People from Mumbai
1973 births